Sułkowice may refer to the following places:
Sułkowice in Lesser Poland Voivodeship (south Poland)
Sułkowice, Kraków County in Lesser Poland Voivodeship (south Poland)
Sułkowice, Wadowice County in Lesser Poland Voivodeship (south Poland)
Sułkowice, Świętokrzyskie Voivodeship (south-central Poland)
Sułkowice, Masovian Voivodeship (east-central Poland)
Sułkowice, Greater Poland Voivodeship (west-central Poland)